Holín is a municipality and village in Jičín District in the Hradec Králové Region of the Czech Republic. It has about 600 inhabitants.

Administrative parts
Villages of Horní Lochov, Pařezská Lhota and Prachov are administrative parts of Holín.

References

Villages in Jičín District